Lavardin is a commune in the Loir-et-Cher department of central France.

It is located on the banks of the river Loir.

Population

Sights
Lavardin is classified as one of the most beautiful villages of France thanks to the ruins of its mediaeval castle (see main article: Château de Lavardin), its Gothic church and frescoes, its houses and the ancient bridge. The village has been frequented by renowned painters since about 1900, most notably Busson and Sauvage.

Early history 
Salomon I of Lavardin became lord of Lavardin around 1030, and his descendants ruled there for the next three centuries. The church of St. Genest in Lavardin was built in the mid-to-late eleventh century, but the existence of a prior Merovingian cemetery on the site attests to the village's existence for several centuries prior to Salomon's reign.

References

External links
 Official website 
 Association des plus beaux villages de France: Lavardin 

Communes of Loir-et-Cher
Plus Beaux Villages de France